The Amazons were a group or race of female warriors in Ancient Greek mythology. Most of them are only briefly named in one or two sources, either as companions of Penthesilea at the Trojan War, or as being killed by Heracles during his 12 labours.

Mythology

Labour of Heracles 
Many stories about Heracles and his 12 labours mention different Amazons being killed by him. These include Alcippe, Asteria, Celaeno, Deianira, Eriboea and Tecmessa. Others, like Aella and Pantariste, fought Heracles but weren't killed.

Trojan War 
John Tzetzes gives in his Posthomerica a list of Amazons who went with queen Penthesilea to the Trojan War and were killed in battle: Anchimache, Andro, Androdaixa, Antianeira, Aspidocharme, Chalcaor, Cnemis, Enchesimargos, Eurylophe, Gortyessa, Iodoce, Ioxeia, Oistrophe, Pharetre, Thorece, Toxoanassa, and Toxophone.

Quintus Smyrnaeus, in his Posthomerica, also gives a list of the companions of Penthesilea at Troy who were killed there by the Greek warriors. Achilles killed Antandre, Antibrote, Harmothoe, Hippothoe, and Polemusa; Diomedes killed Alcibie and Derimacheia, Idomeneus of Crete killed Bremusa, Podarces killed Clonie after she had killed his comrade Menippus, Ajax the Lesser killed Derinoe after she had killed Laogonus, and Meriones killed Evandre and Thermodosa.

Other named Amazons 
Agave
Alke
Dioxippe
Euryale
Glauce
Lysippe
Melanippe
Menippe
Molpadia
Mytilene
Xanthe

Amazons named in non-literary sources 
Some Amazons are not known from literary sources, but only from inscriptions on vases. Areto is depicted on an Attic black-figure vase. Creusa is known from a vase from Cumae. Iphito is only known from inscriptions. Xanthippe is known from a red-figure vase.

See also
 List of valkyrie names

References

Greek mythology-related lists